Tagicetus is an extinct genus of dolphin belonging to the polyphyletic family Kentriodontidae.

Although classified in the subfamily Kentriodontinae by Lambert et al. (2005), recent cladistic analysis places it as closer to extant delphinoids than to Kentriodon.

References

Prehistoric toothed whales
Prehistoric cetacean genera
Fossil taxa described in 2005